Grupo Puma is the largest mortar producer in Spain.

The Group consist in more than 20 factories in Spain and Portugal with an output of more than 2 million tonnes of products each year.

It was founded in 1985 by the Jimenez and Figueras families who still hold the majority in the group.

Product range goes from basic rendering mortars to sophisticated two part tile adhesives or ETICS systems.

References

Manufacturing companies of Spain
Masonry